Valavanti is a village in Mawal taluka of Pune district in the state of Maharashtra, India.

Administration
The village is administrated by a sarpanch, an elected representative who leads a gram panchayat. At the time of the 2011 Census of India, the gram panchayat governed four villages and was based at Govitri.

Demographics
At the 2011 census, the village comprised 45 households. The population of 250 was split between 142 males and 108 females.

See also
List of villages in Mawal taluka

References

Villages in Mawal taluka